Live in Japan is a live album by punk rock band Sham 69, recorded at Clockwise Mobile Studio in Kawasaki, Kanagawa, Japan in March 1991 and released in 1994 (see 1994 in music).

Track listing 
"What Have You Got?"
"Angels with Dirty Faces"
"You're a Better Man Than I" (Brian Hugg) (The Yardbirds/Manfred Mann Chapter Three cover)
"Tell the Children"
"Poor Cow"
"How The West Was Won"
"Caroline's Suitcase"
"Borstal Breakout"
"Vision & Power"
"If the Kids Are United"
"Money"
"Hersham Boys"
"Rip and Tear"

References 

Sham 69 live albums
1994 live albums